Tibbits Brook is a stream in Sherburne County, in the U.S. state of Minnesota.

Tibbits Brook was named for four brothers who settled near the stream.

See also
List of rivers of Minnesota

References

Rivers of Sherburne County, Minnesota
Rivers of Minnesota